Brechmorhoga praecox, the slender clubskimmer, is a species of skimmer in the dragonfly family Libellulidae. It is found in Central America and South America.

The IUCN conservation status of Brechmorhoga praecox is "LC", least concern, with no immediate threat to the species' survival. The population is stable. The IUCN status was reviewed in 2017.

Subspecies
These three subspecies belong to the species Brechmorhoga praecox:
 Brechmorhoga praecox grenadensis Kirby, 1894
 Brechmorhoga praecox postlobata Calvert, 1898
 Brechmorhoga praecox praecox (Hagen, 1861)

References

Further reading

 

Libellulidae
Articles created by Qbugbot
Insects described in 1861